Saint-Maurice-d'Ételan is a commune in the Seine-Maritime department in the Normandy region in northern France.

Geography

Population

Places of interest

 The church of St. Maurice, dating from the fifteenth century.
 The fourteenth-century chateau.

People

 Félix Faure (1841–1899), 7th president of France
 André Bettencourt (1919–2007), government minister
 Ernest Picard-Destelan , French navy officer
 Laurence de Cambronne (1951–), editor in chief of the magazine Elle

See also
Château d'Ételan
Communes of the Seine-Maritime department

References

Communes of Seine-Maritime